David Twohill (born 21 April 1954) is an Australian musician formerly with rock band Mental As Anything who is also known by the pseudonym Wayne DeLisle or as Bird.

Early life
Twohill was born in Cooma, New South Wales, Australia on 21 April 1954. After matriculating at Waverley College in 1972, where he was the drummer in a school band named "Thackeray's Onion", he attended the East Sydney Technical College at Darlinghurst. Here he met, and later auditioned on drums with, fellow students Chris O'Doherty, Martin Murphy and Steve Coburn who were putting a band together. The band would soon be called Mental As Anything and would become well known around Australia and the world. Twohill performed under the pseudonym Wayne de Lisle for most of his time as a member. In September 2004 he was sacked from the band by two of his bandmates. He lodged a wrongful dismissal case against his former bandmates with the NSW Industrial Relations Commission in 2007, which he won.

Art career
Twohill is not a recognised artist, however he has had works exhibited at various group art exhibitions.  He has tended to concentrate on curatorial responsibilities, with exhibitions at Tamworth, Manly and Liverpool under his control.

Mental As Anything

Pseudonym/Nickname
In the early days of the Mentals, the band would often invent pseudonyms for each other that combined an exotic last name with a common Australian first name. The nickname of "Bird" (or "C-Byrd" as it was often written) was bestowed by Reg Mombassa who thought the scavenging seagulls at Bondi Beach reminded him of Twohill. The nickname was immortalised in the Mentals song "Looking For Bird" from the Cats & Dogs album.

2001 Bushfires
Twohill, with his wife Sue, was in the national news on Christmas Day 2001 when their house was lost in bushfires—a benefit gig, Bird's Big Burnout, occurred at Revesby in early 2002 and a four-piece Midnight Oil minus Peter Garrett performed.

References

1954 births
Living people
Australian musicians